Florence Tsague (born 1977 in Bafou-Djuttitsa, west of Cameroon in West Africa), is a Cameroonian political scientist and writer.

Career 
Tsagué A. is a member of several organizations such as the African Union in Siegerland (region of Germany) and African Development Initiative. She is an accredited lecturer at  Europäische Akademie NRW. In addition to her publications in the press such as Africa Positive, She organizes reading sessions in the  Siegen area. In 2008 she took part in Siegen Wittgenstein's poets and writers tour entitled "Menschen zwischen den Kulturen". She writes news, poems and novels. Her first novel, Famous Women, Unknown Co-Wives, was published in August 2009. In this novel, which takes the reader into a rich world of cultures and traditions, she talks about the discrimination of women and girls in the inheritance system in Cameroon. It also contains themes on polygamy, child abuse and complicit silence. The book pleads for the adaptation of the culture that addresses the urgent problems of its time and thus participates in a debate which in African societies are dominated by the elders. This novel was nominated for the Pan-literate prize of the association "Africa Culture Rhein-Neckar".

References 

German activists
German women activists
Cameroonian political scientists
Living people
Women political scientists
1977 births